"The Islander" is the tenth track on symphonic metal band Nightwish’s Dark Passion Play album. It was confirmed to be the album's fourth single on the website Nightwish-World on February 23, 2008, only a week after the third single, "Bye Bye Beautiful", was released. It was released on May 21, 2008, a month after the video which premiered on April 14.

As with some of Nightwish' other songs (including for example "Creek Mary's Blood" from Once), the song is highly influenced by folk music rather than the symphonic power metal they usually play, and uses only acoustic guitars, rather than electric. It is fully acoustic, except the use of some keyboard effects and drums, though folk-inspired. Marko Hietala sings the whole song with backing vocals from Anette Olzon and Tuomas Holopainen. He also wrote all of the music for the song, unlike most others, which were written by Tuomas Holopainen. The song used guest musician Troy Donockley who is featured on several instruments.

The single features an instrumental version of "Bye Bye Beautiful" B-side "Escapist", as well as an orchestral version of "Meadows of Heaven". It also features the videos to "The Islander" and "Bye Bye Beautiful".

Music video
The music video was filmed in Rovaniemi, in Finnish Lapland, in October 2007, and Holopainen commented that they at first didn't plan to make a third video for the album, but when they were offered Finnish beauty, they couldn't resist it. He has also said that for once the lyrics actually fits with the video, which is "a sort of Lapp wilderness combined with the surrealism of Salvador Dalí." The video features guest musician Troy Donockley, who would later become an official member of Nightwish.

The video was directed by Stobe Harju and produced by Ilkka Immonen of Lapland Studio Oy. It has a steampunk theme with airships, and features the old sailor (the "Islander" of the title) walking along a beach through the fog dragging a boat behind him and haunted by ghosts of his past. Later we see him in a flashback as a young man playing the uilleann pipes (portrayed by Troy Donockley) with trees blossoming after he ends his life by dropping anchor and being relieved of his burdens.

Live performances

"The Islander" quickly became a frequently performed song throughout the Dark Passion Play World Tour. An obvious change in the mood both on stage and in the audience is to be seen as darkness and silence suddenly embrace the stage, which is lightened up by a few outdoor torches. A spotlight shines on Hietala and Vuorinen, who sit on two chairs with acoustic guitars, and start to play the song.

Nevalainen enjoyed a moment of rest, and Holopainen added some piano-playing with his keyboards, but Olzon could not be seen. Olzon eventually showed up and turned the song into a duet towards the end. She was most often seen wearing a tiara during the song, to fit with the line "Princess in the tower.." At the end of the song, Holopainen usually also played a bit of '"The Heart Asks Pleasure First", the main theme by Michael Nyman from the movie The Piano, a piece of music the band covered but didn't get the permission to release from Nyman.

Holopainen has said that the song is one of the major moments of their concerts, as it is so different from the rest, making it all a very special, emotional moment. At the UK and Ireland dates on the Dark Passion Play tour, the band were often joined by Troy Donockley for this song as well as "Last of the Wilds", with the exception of the Glasgow date. In the 2009 leg of the tour Troy played with the band during all the European tour.

Track listing

Chart performance
"The Islander" went straight to #1 in Finland on the first day of its release. Recently, Nightwish have had major success in Spain and "The Islander" reached #5 in the Spanish Singles Chart, continuing a run of Top 5 singles from Dark Passion Play.

Personnel
Marko Hietala – Male vocals, Acoustic guitars
Emppu Vuorinen - Acoustic guitars
Tuomas Holopainen – Keyboards
Anette Olzon – Female vocals
Jukka Nevalainen – Percussions
Troy Donockley - Bodhran, Uilleann Pipes, Tin Whistle
London Philharmonic Orchestra - Orchestral parts

References

External links
Nightwish's Official Website

2008 singles
Nightwish songs
Number-one singles in Finland
Songs written by Tuomas Holopainen
Heavy metal ballads
Songs written by Marco Hietala
Spinefarm Records singles
Nuclear Blast Records singles
Roadrunner Records singles
2007 songs
Folk rock songs
Male–female vocal duets